Roar of the People is a 1941 Hong Kong wartime drama film directed by Tang Xiaodan.

The film is set in Hong Kong during the Second Sino-Japanese War, when people fled to Hong Kong from Mainland China. It was released five months before the start of the Japanese occupation of Hong Kong.

Cast
 Cheung Ying - workers' leader
 Fung Fung		
 Wong An	
 Chan Tin-Tsung
 Fung Ying-Seong	
 Ng Wui	
 Lee Tan-Lo	
 Leong Mo-Sik	
 Cho Tat-wah	
 Gao Luquan (credited as Ko Lo-Chuen)

References

External links
 
 
 Roar of the People at Hong Kong Cinemagic

1941 films
1940s war drama films
Cantonese-language films
Hong Kong black-and-white films
Hong Kong war drama films
1941 drama films